Adambar  is a village in the Nannilam taluk of Tiruvarur district in Tamil Nadu, India.

As per the 2001 census, Adambar OR Athambar had a population of 1,609 with 824 males and 785 females. The sex ratio was 953. The literacy rate was 80.74.

A Beautiful village surrounded by Greeneries in all sides. Adambar shri Kothandaramar temple and a 13th century Shiva temple are located in the village. It has historical connection with Great Epic Ramayana. This is the place where Rama vow to kill(Atham) the magic dear which Sita devi wanted. The village name is derived from this historical incident. People are Generous in nature..

following ancient temples are in Adambar village

Sri Siddhi Vinayaga Temple.

Shri Kothandaramar Temple.

Lord Siva Temple.

Maha Mariamman Temple.

Pidari Amman Temple.

Shri Kothandaramar, Raman has many temples on the banks of the Kaveri. One of them, Adambar. Athambar is a small village that is developing peacefully. 2 km away from the main road. Inclusive city. "He who has devotion to me will come looking for me wherever I am," says Mohan with a smile, as if to say, "This is Adambar Raman.To be Sita and Lakshman on the side, Hanuman in a polite look asking for mouth-packing orders under Thiruvadi! The assumption that will be displayed in this look is "Dasa Anjaneyar" Ramadasan!

Usually the idols of Rama, Sita and Lakshmana are placed separately on a pedestal. Here the three figures are arranged together on the same pedestal. Is the life of the trio inseparable? The pose of Rama standing with a bow in the left hand and an arrow in the right makes us look at him again and again. Nowhere else can we see Rama in such a form. That’s why, it seems like it attracts us again and again! Moolavar Kalyana Ranganathar is in a separate shrine as Sridevi-Bhudevi Sametara.

Below these majestic three idols, on the lower pedestal is Utsavar Rajagopalan, the Bama-Rukmini Sakitha. Near him is Narthana Gopalan. Everything is iPhone sirs.On the right in front of the sanctum are some forms of Vishwaksena, Nammazhvar, Thirumangaiyalvar, Ramanujar, in order! Legend: To separate Rama from Sita, Morrison came as a liar in the form of Ponman. Fascinated by the magic, Sita asked him to hold it. "No, there's something manipulative in this," said Raman. "Sita's face withered."But when he found out, "That's not it! Morrison," he said, "I won't let you kill me."The deer disappeared in many ways and ran away. This "Adambar" site is the place where Raman finally shot an arrow towards the deer.

The place where the arrow flew and stitched the deer was "Manthai" (deer + tai) next to Ithalat.The inscription in the temple reads, "Raame the bow of Rama and from the place to the deer." There is a message that he shot an arrow saying 'Hadam Bar' and later changed to 'Hadam Bar' and became 'Adambar'. The oldest temple, however, is unknown to the outside world as it is within a very compact city. Buses now ply four times a day. However get off at the bus stop near the village by bus and walk a short distance to the temple.Agraharam in front of the temple also has ancient drive houses. The village is not very nomadic. The beautiful Allith Lake welcomes us into the city. The streets are quiet but spacious and clean.The mythology of Kavirkarai Ram temples in general shows its antiquity.

Ramanavami is celebrated very well here. Take a stroll down Ursavar Street. All the people of the village are ardent devotees of this Ram. Only one periodical puja is conducted with the help of the Hindu Charitable Trust.If the devotees of Rama make the place and the temple known to all, the beauty of Atambar will be available to the devotees with the vision of Rama and his offering of grace.Ramer knows who is going to get up in mind and work to get this good done!Coming around the temple, we see the beauty of Rama's face again, praising the heart, relieving the stress, and returning with satisfaction.

References 

 

Villages in Tiruvarur district